Blake Everett Berris is an American actor known for his roles both in independent films and television.

Career 
Berris originated the role of Nick Fallon on NBC's soap opera Days of Our Lives for which he received an Emmy nomination. Other TV credits include  AMC's Breaking Bad, CBS's The Big Bang Theory, Netflix's Longmire, and Freeform's hit show, Pretty Little Liars.

In 2015 was the Axe - Man in Europe, South America, the Middle East, and Asia.

Performed onstage with Laura Dern in the play, If All The Sky Were Paper, at the Kirk Douglas Theater in 2014.

Personal life 
Berris was born to Kenneth and Lauren Berris in Minneapolis, Minnesota. He grew up in Santa Barbara, California. His sister teaches high school drama.

Berris graduated from University of California, Los Angeles in three years as an acting major in the School of Theater, Film, and TV and went on to study and participate in a theater program at the University of Oxford.

On 26 August 2017, Blake married Alexandra McGuinness, the daughter of Paul McGuinness, the ex-manager of U2, at Killiskey Parish Church, Nun's Cross, near Ashford, Co. Wicklow Ireland. Members of U2 attended the wedding.

Awards 
 2009 – Daytime Emmy Awards – Outstanding Younger Actor – Nominated
 2013 Gasparilla Film Festival - Rising Star Award for his role as Dusty Peterson in Meth Head
 2013 FilmOut San Diego - Best Supporting Actor Award for his role as Dusty Peterson in Meth Head

Filmography

References

External links 
 

Male actors from California
American male soap opera actors
Living people
UCLA Film School alumni
1984 births